In enzymology, a 3"-deamino-3"-oxonicotianamine reductase is an enzyme that catalyzes the chemical reaction

2'-deoxymugineic acid + NAD(P)+  3"-deamino-3"-oxonicotianamine + NAD(P)H + H+

The 3 substrates of this enzyme are 2'-deoxymugineic acid, NAD+, and NADP+, whereas its 4 products are 3-deamino-3-oxonicotianamine, NADH, NADPH, and H+.

This enzyme belongs to the family of oxidoreductases, specifically those acting on the CH-OH group of donor with NAD+ or NADP+ as acceptor. The systematic name of this enzyme class is 2-deoxymugineic acid:NAD(P)+ 3-oxidoreductase.

References 

 

EC 1.1.1
NADPH-dependent enzymes
NADH-dependent enzymes
Enzymes of unknown structure